Yoruba herbalists and priests enlist the aid of Osanyin, the spirit of herbal medicines, or Opa Erinle, in their work against mental and physical illness caused by malevolent forces and individuals. The Yoruba believe the power of Osanyin is vested in a wrought iron staff, called an Osanyin staff, that is placed on altars to this Orisha.

The staff is composed of a circle of small birds and a shaft in the middle that elevates a large bird above smaller ones. Babatunde Lawal suggests that the reason for this division could be to suggest the relaying of metaphysical powers from the celestial to the terrestrial realm. Lawal evokes the Yoruba reference to Osanyin as "The one who sees everything, like Olodumare," allowing him a vantage point from which he can protect all of humanity below.

The birds, emissaries of Ogun, refer to the herbalist's understanding of and power over these malevolent people. There are typically sixteen birds, invoking the most sacred number of divination, surrounding and confronting the central bird, which represents the smallpox god. 

The birds on Osanyin staffs suggest an iconographic link with the birds on Obas' crowns.

References

Yoruba art
Yoruba culture
Yoruba religion
Yoruba history
African art
Nigerian art